Harry Jones is a professional Australian rules footballer who most recently played for the Hawthorn Football Club in the Australian Football League (AFL).

AFL career

Wodonga resident Harry Jones was selected by Hawthorn with the 7th pick in the 2017 AFL Rookie Draft. Jones was recruited as a midfielder but the club has helped him develop his defensive game. His first year at Box Hill ended with the need for shoulder surgery. In his second year on the list in 2019, Jones was a pre-season stand-out; he was expected to make his senior debut but a season-ending knee injury (PCL) ruled him out.

Jones made his AFL debut in round 5, 2020, against  at Spotless Stadium. He finished his debut season on the injury list. Jones was delisted at the end of the 2020 season.

In 2021 Jones was signed by North Melbourne (VFL) side. He was awarded the 2021 John Law Medal, the club’s best and fairest player in the VFL.

Personal life
Jones is currently studying a Bachelor of Business at Deakin University.

Statistics
Statistics are correct to the end of 2020.

|- style=background:#EAEAEA
| scope="row" | 2018 ||  || 40
| 0 || — || — || — || — || — || — || — || — || — || — || — || — || — || — || —
|-
| scope="row" | 2019 ||  || 40
| 0 || — || — || — || — || — || — || — || — || — || — || — || — || — || — || —
|- style=background:#EAEAEA
| scope="row" | 2020 ||  || 40
| 1 || 0 || 0 || 3 || 8 || 11 || 1 || 4 || 0.0 || 0.0 || 3.0 || 8.0 || 11.0 || 1.0 || 4.0 || 0
|- class="sortbottom"
! colspan=3| Career
! 1 !! 0 !! 0 !! 3 !! 8 !! 11 !! 1 !! 4 !! 0.0 !! 0.0 !! 3.0 !! 8.0 !! 11.0 !! 1.0 !! 4.0 !! 0
|}

Notes

References

External links

Living people
1999 births
Australian rules footballers from Victoria (Australia)
Murray Bushrangers players
Box Hill Football Club players
Hawthorn Football Club players